Sania Mirza and Mara Santangelo were the defending champions, but chose not to participate that year.

Květa Peschke and Lisa Raymond won in the final 4–6, 7–5, 10–7, against Sorana Cîrstea and Monica Niculescu.

Seeds

Draw

External links
Draw

Women's Doubles
Pilot Pen Tennis